Dylan Enrique Ruiz-Diaz (born 12 March 2001) is an Australian footballer who plays for Juventud.

Club career

Central Coast Mariners
Ruiz-Diaz made his professional debut as a second-half substitute in a Round 26 clash with Western Sydney Wanderers, replacing Matt Simon in the 94th minute in a 3–1 win. On 20 January 2020, after 3 appearances in the A-League, he penned a one-year scholarship deal with the Mariners.

Honours

International
Australia U20
AFF U-19 Youth Championship: 2019

Individual
 AFF U-19 Youth Championship Top scorer: 2019

References

External links
 

2001 births
Living people
Association football forwards
Australian soccer players
Central Coast Mariners FC players
Wisła Puławy players
A-League Men players
II liga players
IV liga players
National Premier Leagues players
Australian people of Spanish descent
Australian expatriate soccer players
Australian expatriate sportspeople in Poland
Expatriate footballers in Poland